G protein-activated inward rectifier potassium channel 1 (GIRK-1) is encoded in the human by the gene KCNJ3.

Potassium channels are present in most mammalian cells, where they participate in a wide range of physiologic responses. The protein encoded by this gene is an integral membrane protein and inward-rectifier type potassium channel. The encoded protein, which has a greater tendency to allow potassium to flow into a cell rather than out of a cell, is controlled by G-proteins and plays an important role in regulating heartbeat. It associates with three other G-protein-activated potassium channels to form a hetero-tetrameric pore-forming complex.

Interactions
KCNJ3 has been shown to interact with KCNJ5.

See also
 G protein-coupled inwardly-rectifying potassium channel
 Inward-rectifier potassium ion channel

References

Further reading

External links 
 

Ion channels